Travis Tremaine Stephens (born June 26, 1978) is a former American football running back. He played one season in the National Football League (NFL) for the Tampa Bay Buccaneers after being drafted by the team in the fourth round of the 2002 NFL Draft with the 119th overall pick. He played college football at the University of Tennessee, where he is the single season record holder for rushing yards (1,464 yards in 2001). He was a first-team AP All America selection.

Early years
Stephens attended Northeast High School in Clarksville, Tennessee. He played football for Northeast. He was a three-year starter at wingback and tailback on offense and linebacker and safety on defense. He rushed for a school-record 2,550 yards and 23 touchdowns in his junior season. In addition, he recorded 87 tackles and two interceptions as a free safety on defense. As a senior, he rushed for 991 yards and eight touchdowns despite having to deal with an ankle injury. Stephens committed to the University of Tennessee to play college football under head coach Phillip Fulmer.

College career

1997 season
In Stephens's freshman season with the Volunteers, he was part of a strong backfield that contained Jamal Lewis and Shawn Bryson. On the season, he recorded nine rushes for 36 yards. In the 1998 Orange Bowl loss to Nebraska, Stephens did not record any statistics but did appear late in the game. Tennessee scored a touchdown late and on the two-point conversion, Stephens caught a pass from quarterback Tee Martin in the fourth quarter.

1998 season
In Stephens's sophomore season, he saw more work despite being in a crowded backfield with Travis Henry, Jamal Lewis, and Shawn Bryson. He would record 107 rushes for 477 yards and four touchdowns. In addition, he had two receptions for three yards in regular season play. Tennessee completed an undefeated 13-0 season in the 1998 season. The season culminated in the Fiesta Bowl where the Volunteers defeated the Florida State Seminoles by a score of 23-16. In the National Championship, Stephens had 13 carries for 60 yards.

1999 season
Stephens was redshirted in the 1999 season due to continued trend of a crowded backfield. With Stephens redshirting, Jamal Lewis and Travis Henry did most of the rushing for the Volunteers in 1999.

2000 season
As a redshirt junior, Stephens entered the 2000 season with Travis Henry to form a solid combination of running backs for the 8–4 Volunteers. On the season, he had 81 carries for 359 yards and seven touchdowns in regular season play. In addition, he had six receptions for 28 yards in regular season play.

2001 season
In his redshirt senior season, Stephens was the number one running back for the 11–2 Volunteers. On the season, he had 291 rushes for a single-season school-record 1,464 yards and ten touchdowns. In addition, he had 19 receptions for 169 yards and one touchdown in regular season play. In the 2002 Florida Citrus Bowl, Stephens had 16 carries for 38 yards, one rushing touchdown, and one reception for 19 yards in the 45-17 victory over the Michigan Wolverines. He earned All-American honors for the 2001 season.

In his collegiate career at Tennessee, Stephens had 488 rushes for 2,338 yards and 21 touchdowns in regular season play. In addition, he recorded 27 receptions for 200 yards and one touchdown in regular season play.

Statistics

Professional career

Tampa Bay Buccaneers
Stephens was drafted by the Tampa Bay Buccaneers in the fourth round with the 119th overall pick in the 2002 NFL Draft. In a game against the New Orleans Saints on September 8, he had one reception for six yards. His one reception would be his only meaningful recorded statistic in his NFL career. He was considered part of the team when they won Super Bowl XXXVII over the Oakland Raiders. Stephens was released from the Buccaneers before the 2003 season.

Houston Texans
The Houston Texans signed Stephens to a futures contract before the 2004 season. He was eventually allocated to NFL Europe and placed on their exempt/injured list. After this stint with the Texans, Stephens' professional career ended.

Personal life
Since his days as a football player, Stephens has continued to stay in the game. In 2017, he helped out with youth football camps in Jackson, Tennessee with some other Tennessee alumni.

References

External links

Collegiate statistics at Sports-Reference.com
Tennessee Volunteers bio

1978 births
Living people
American football running backs
Houston Texans players
Tennessee Volunteers football players
Tampa Bay Buccaneers players
People from Clarksville, Tennessee
Players of American football from Tennessee